The Pit is a 1982 arcade action game released by Zilec in the United Kingdom, and licensed to Centuri in North America and Taito in Japan. The game was designed by Andy Walker and Tony Gibson, and developed by AW Electronics. The objective of The Pit is to descend into an underground labyrinth, retrieve a gem, and escape.

A game similar to The Pit, programmed by Chris Gray, inspired Peter Liepa to create Boulder Dash.

Gameplay 

The player's avatar (described as "The Astronaut-Explorer" by the game manual) lands in a spaceship and must dig his way into a series of tunnels. While there, he must avoid being crushed by rocks, eaten by monsters, impaled by arrows, or melted in a vat of acid.  In lieu of a traditional timer is a tank (the "Zonker") shooting away a mountain near the player's spaceship. If the player dallies too long in the maze, the Zonker will destroy the player's spaceship, and the player loses a life.

After collecting the treasure, the only route back to the spaceship is by crossing "The Pit", which is a room with a sliding retractable floor underneath which is a monster that will devour a player who tarries too long.

The player receives 200 points for shooting each enemy, 1000 points for each crystal collected, 2000 points for collecting buried treasure, and 1000 points for crossing "The Pit" safely and reboarding the ship.

Release 
The Pit was released in April 1982. A sub-genre of action games with digging mechanics was emerging at the time. Namco's Dig Dug was released in March 1982 in Japan, just a month before The Pit released, with Dig Dug releasing internationally the same month in April 1982. This led to some controversy, with Dig Dugs US distributor Atari, Inc. threatening legal action, but Centuri registered their US copyright for The Pit three weeks earlier than Atari did for Dig Dug. The Pit designer Andy Walker claimed he demonstrated a prototype of The Pit at a trade show where it was seen by some Japanese people who may have been from Namco or Atari.

Ports 
The tank is labeled "Zilec" in the U.K. version, and "Taito" in the Japanese version. In addition, the game map layout as well as the color palette differ between the regional versions. The game was ported from the original 6502 processor board to Centuri's Z80 board in 1982.

A port for the Commodore 64 was published in 1983 and one for the VIC-20 in 1984. Bandai released a portable VFD handheld version of The Pit in 1983 as FL Exploration of Space Zackman: The Pit. It was also sold by Tandy in the US and some European countries as Zackman, Tandy Space Explorer.

See also 
 Borderline (1981)
 Dig Dug (1982)

References

External links

1982 video games
Arcade video games
Commodore 64 games
VIC-20 games
Video games developed in the United Kingdom
Taito arcade games